Riyadh Nouri (born 1 July 1951) is a former Iraqi football midfielder who played for Iraq in the 1972 AFC Asian Cup and 1974 FIFA World Cup qualification. He played for the national team between 1970 and 1977.

On 11 March 1973, Riyadh scored Iraq's first ever World Cup qualification goal against Australia.

Career statistics

International goals
Scores and results list Iraq's goal tally first.

References

Iraqi footballers
Iraq international footballers
Al-Shorta SC players
Living people
Association football midfielders
1972 AFC Asian Cup players
1951 births